Chen Mei-feng is a Taiwanese actress. She was the female lead in The Spirits of Love and Night Market Life.

References

External links
 

Taiwanese television actresses
Taiwanese Hokkien pop singers
Taiwanese women singer-songwriters
Living people
1956 births
20th-century Taiwanese women singers